Mordellistena hollandica is a species of beetle in the genus Mordellistena of the family Mordellidae, part of the superfamily Tenebrionoidea. It was described in 1966 by Ermisch.

References

hollandica
Beetles described in 1966
Endemic fauna of the Netherlands